Silvana Vásquez (born 1988) is a model and a pageant titleholder who won the title Miss Earth Peru 2010 in the Miss International Peru 2010 pageant on April 24, 2010. Miss International Peru selects representatives for Miss Earth and Miss International pageants. Vásquez represented Peru in the Miss Earth 2010 pageant, held in Nha Trang, Vietnam.

References

1988 births
Living people
Peruvian beauty pageant winners
Miss Earth 2010 contestants
People from Lima
Peruvian female models